The 1905 Davidson football team was an American football team that represented the Davidson College as an independent during the 1905 college football season. In their second year under head coach Bob Williams, the team compiled a 3–4 record.

Schedule

References

Davidson
Davidson Wildcats football seasons
Davidson football